Kering is a French-based multinational corporation specializing in luxury goods. It owns the brands Balenciaga, Bottega Veneta, Gucci, Alexander McQueen and Yves Saint Laurent.

The timber-trading company Pinault S.A. was founded in 1963, by François Pinault. After the company was quoted on Euronext Paris in 1988, it became the retail conglomerate Pinault-Printemps-Redoute (PPR) in 1994, and the luxury group Kering in 2013. The group has been a constituent of the CAC 40 since 1995. François-Henri Pinault has been president and CEO of Kering since 2005. In 2020, the group's revenue reached €13.1 billion.

History

From timber trading to retail 
In 1963, with a loan from his family and a bank, François Pinault opened the Établissements Pinault in Brittany (France) specialized in timber trading. The company became Pinault S.A. and grew organically and through acquisitions. In 1988, Pinault S.A. was listed on the Paris Stock Exchange.

In 1989, Pinault S.A. purchased 20% of CFAO, a French distribution conglomerate active throughout Africa. In 1990, Pinault S.A. and CFAO merged, and François Pinault became head of the newly formed group. This accelerated its acquisitions in the retail sector: Conforama (French furniture retailer) in 1991, Printemps (department stores in France) in 1992, which also owned 54% of La Redoute (French mail-order shopping retailer), and Fnac (French bookstore, multimedia and electronics retailer) in 1994. To align with its new activities, the group was renamed Pinault-Printemps-Redoute in 1994.

In 1999, Pinault-Printemps-Redoute purchased a controlling 42% stake of the Gucci group for $3 billion and 100% of Yves Saint Laurent. Those acquisitions marked the cornerstone of the group's shift towards luxury. After Gucci, Pinault-Printemps-Redoute acquired Boucheron (2000), Bottega Veneta (2001), Balenciaga (2001), and signed strategic partnerships with Alexander McQueen and Stella McCartney. In 2004, Pinault-Printemps-Redoute reached a 99.4% ownership of Gucci.

From retail to luxury 
In 2003, François Pinault handed over the helm of Artémis, the family holding company that controlled Pinault-Printemps-Redoute to his son François-Henri. In 2005, François-Henri Pinault became president and CEO of Pinault-Printemps-Redoute, succeeding to Serge Weinberg. The group officially changed its name to PPR. and kept on building a portfolio of luxury brands: The Sowind Group (owner of Girard-Perregaux) and Brioni (2011), the Pomellato Group (Pomellato and Dodo, 2012), Qeelin (2012), Christopher Kane (2013), Ulysse Nardin (2014). To further this strategy, PPR offloaded its retail assets: Le Printemps (2006), Conforama (2011), CFAO (2012), Fnac (2012), and La Redoute (2013). PPR also developed a Sport & Lifestyle portfolio with the acquisition of Puma (2007), Cobra Golf (2010), and Volcom (2011). Cobra and Volcom have since then been divested (see the respective pages for details) and Kering only holds a minority share in Puma.

In March 2013, PPR changed its name to Kering to reflect the group's shift towards luxury. Pronounced , to sound like the English word "caring", the new name is a reference to the Pinault family's region of origin, Brittany, where kêr means "home".

Part of Kering's strategy is to name unexpected designers at the creative direction of its brands. In December 2014, Alessandro Michele, a 12-year accessories designer at Gucci, was named its creative director. He introduced an acclaimed « sophisticated, intellectual and androgynous feel » for the Florentine fashion brand which tripled its sales in 5 years. In 2015, following Yves Saint-Laurent's year-on-year double-digit growth under the creative direction of Hedi Slimane, Kering named a new creative director, Anthony Vaccarello, to renew the brand’s props. In October 2015, Kering named Georgian-born designer Demna Gvasalia as creative director of Balenciaga to reinvent the classic Spanish couture house. In a less speculative move, Kering appointed Daniel Lee - Celine's former ready-to-wear designer - as creative designer of Bottega Veneta in June 2018.

In 2014, Kering launched Kering Eyewear and hired Roberto Vedovotto, former CEO of Safilo Group, to pilot its development. In March 2017, Richemont partnered with Kering Eyewear to produce Cartier, Alaïa, and Montblanc eyewear. In September 2019, Kering Eyewear opened a 15,000 square-metre logistics centre near Padua, Italy, with an annual output capacity of five million eyewear units. In March 2022, it was announced Kering Eyewear had acquired the Hawaiian eyewear brand, Maui Jim. In March 2018, Kering agreed to sell its shares of Stella McCartney back to its eponymous owner. Kering became a luxury pure player after the sale of Puma (2018) and Volcom (2019). After the group built up its portfolio of luxury brands, it stopped acquisitions and capitalized on its brands' organic growth. In 2020, Kering made 13.1 billion euros in revenue, -17.9% from the previous year. In 2021, Kering led a $216-million investment round in the luxury resale website Vestiaire Collective and acquired 100% stake in the Danish luxury eyewear manufacturer Lindberg. In January 2022, the group announced its intention to sell its watches division, namely the brands Girard-Perregaux and Ulysse Nardin.

From luxury to sustainability 

Since Kering became a luxury brand, the group focused its development on sustainable development for the luxury fashion industry. In 2006 Kering purchased the Balenciaga brand from Jacques Bogart S.A.

In April 2012, Kering committed to a 4-year plan to significantly reduce its impact on the environment. The group developed the "Environmental Profit & Loss account" (EP&L) accounting method to track its progress. In 2017, the group presented its new sustainability program which targeted a 40% reduction of its global environmental impact by 2025, a strategy aligned with the UN Sustainable Development Goals. In September 2019, Kering committed to become carbon-neutral within its operations and its supply chain.

In 2013, after opening the Material Innovation Lab, a center in Novara, Italy, specialized in innovative materials and fabric sustainability, Kering became part of the Dow Jones Sustainability Indices and was named top sustainable textile, apparel and luxury goods corporation" in the Corporate Knights’ Global 100 index in 2018

The Kering Foundation was created in 2008 to support women's rights initiatives worldwide. The Foundation works with local partners focused on women issues and gender equity. Alongside Gucci, Kering is a strategic partner of Chime for Change, an international campaign focused on women's education, health and justice, launched by Salma Hayek-Pinault, Frida Giannini (former CEO of Gucci), and Beyoncé. From 2012 to 2018, the Kering Foundation contributed to the International Day for the Elimination of Violence against Women with the White Ribbon campaign. In 2015, Kering became an official partner of the Festival de Cannes and launched the program Women in Motion to raise women's issues in the film industry (extended to the Rencontres d'Arles photography festival in March 2019).

In October 2018, Kering started to implement the use of the first 100% traceable organic cotton. In December 2018, with Plug and Play, Kering launched the Kering Sustainable Innovation Award to reward and invest in startups focused on sustainability and luxury. In May 2019, the group aligned with the strict European Union standards for animal welfare and banned models under 18 from its shows and photo shootings. The French President Emmanuel Macron mandated François-Henri Pinault to promote an industry coalition for sustainability.  In August 2019, Kering presented the Fashion Pact during the 45th G7 summit, an initiative signed by 32 fashion firms committing to concrete measures to reduce their environmental impact. In October 2020, the Fashion Pact virtually announced its one-year progress at the Copenhagen Fashion Summit, revealing that 80 percent of its members have sped up company-wide sustainability efforts to date.

In September, 2021, Kering announced that in keeping with a "vision of Luxury that is inseparable from the very highest environmental and social values and standards," all of their fashion brands would no longer use animal fur starting with the 2022 collections. In January 2022, Kering joined a consortium of brands committed to shift from wet to mostly dry textile processing.

Activities

Description 

Kering is an international group based in Paris (France) specializing in luxury and fashion goods. Its portfolio includes luxury brands specialized in the design, the making and the sale of fine products, especially in the leather goods, shoes, ready-to-wear, watches and jewellery sectors. Kering Eyewear (30%-owned by Richemont) produces glasses for the luxury sector.

Kering's headquarters are located in the former Hopital Laennec in the 7th arrondissement of Paris. The parent holding company of Kering is Groupe Artémis. In 2020, Kering made 13.1 billion euros in revenue, down 17.5% from the previous year. The group has 30,956 employees and 1,381 stores. Its brands Gucci, Saint Laurent and Bottega Veneta generated 84% of the group's revenue. The leather goods, shoes, and ready-to-wear products represent 87% of the group's revenue. As of 2022, Gucci itself represented 60% of Kering's revenue and 70% of its profit. On January 24, 2022 Kering announces the sale of its entire stake of GIRARD-PERREGAUX and ULYSSE NARDIN to their current management.

Brands 

In 2015, Kering became an official partner of the Cannes Film Festival and launched Women in Motion to highlight the contribution of women to the film industry, in front and behind the camera. The Women in Motion Awards are awarded annually to a person who embodies the role of women in the film industry, and another to a promising name in cinema. The previous winners were:
 2015: Jane Fonda, Megan Ellison
 2016: Geena Davis, Susan Sarandon
 2017: Isabelle Huppert, Maysaloun Hamoud (Young Talents Award)
 2018: Patty Jenkins
2019: Gong Li

Governance

Board of Directors 

 François-Henri Pinault - Chairman and CEO
 Jean-François Palus - Group Managing Director
 Independent directors:
 Yseulys Costes
 Jean-Pierre Denis
 Ginevra Elkann
 Sophie L'Hélias
 Claire Lacaze
 Baudouin Prot
 Daniel Ricardi
 Sapna Sood
 Emma Watson
 Héloïse Temple-Boyer

Executive committee 

 François-Henri Pinault - Chairman and CEO
 Jean-François Palus - Group Managing Director
 Francesca Bellettini - President and CEO Saint Laurent
 Marco Bizzarri - President and CEO Gucci
 Grégory Boutté : Chief Client and Digital Officer
 Jordan Alexander - Director and Marketing Gucci 
 Cédric Charbit : CEO Balenciaga
 Marie-Claire Daveu - Chief Sustainability Officer and Head of Institutional Affairs
 Valérie Duport -  Chief Communications and Image Officer
 Jean-Marc Duplaix - CFO
 Béatrice Lazat - VP Human Resources
 Bartolomeo Rongone - President and CEO Bottega Veneta
 Roberto Vedovotto - CEO Kering Eyewear

Financial data 

 Date of IPO: 25 October 1988, Second Marché
 Shares listed on the Euronext Paris
 Member of the CAC 40 index since 9 February 1995
 Nominal value = euro
 Main shareholders: Artémis 40.8%

From 2016 to 2021, Kering's share price has increased by 352%. In September 2018, Kering joined the STOXX Europe 50 index.  In November 2018, the group announced the share repurchase of 1% of its share capital. In 2019, Kering paid a settlement of 1.25 billion euros ($1.4 billion) to the Italian tax authorities. In 2021, the group repurchased 650,000 of its shares to cancel half of them and allocate the other half to its employees.

See also 
 Kering Foundation
 François Pinault
 François-Henri Pinault
 Groupe Artémis

References

External links
 

 
Luxury brand holding companies
2000s fashion
2010s fashion
French companies established in 1963
1980s initial public offerings
CAC 40
Companies listed on Euronext Paris
Companies in the Euro Stoxx 50
Companies based in Paris
7th arrondissement of Paris
Holding companies established in 1963
Conglomerate companies of France
Watchmaking conglomerates
French business families
Multinational companies headquartered in France
Retail companies of France
Pinault family
Leather manufacturers